Juliana Blou (born 17 May 1995) is a Namibian footballer who plays as a midfielder for the Namibia women's national team.

International career
Blou capped for Namibia at senior level during the 2017 COSAFA Women's Championship.

References

1995 births
Living people
Namibian women's footballers
Namibia women's international footballers
Women's association football midfielders